This is a list of invasions ordered by date. An invasion is a military offensive in which sizable number of combatants of one geopolitical entity aggressively enter territory controlled by another such entity, generally with the objectives of establishing or re-establishing control, retaliation for real or perceived actions, liberation of previously lost territory, forcing the partition of a country, gaining concessions or access to natural resources or strategic positions, effecting a change in the ruling government, or any combination thereof.

2000–present

1945–1999

World War II (1939–1945)

Interwar (1918–1939)

World War I (1914–1918) 

 

See also: World War I timeline

1800–1915

French Revolutionary and Napoleonic Wars (1792–1815) 

See also: French Revolutionary Wars, Napoleonic Wars

1700–1792

1600–1699 
1694 invasion of Lan Xang by Vietnam
1693 invasion of Mongolia by China
1692 invasion of Kingdom of Champa by Vietnam
1688–1689 invasion of Britain by the Dutch Republic
1683 invasion of Kingdom of Tungning by the Qing dynasty
1683 invasion of Austria by Ottoman Empire
1677 invasion of Vietnam by a Mạc army
1674 invasion of Brandenburg by Sweden
1673 invasion of Poland by Ottoman Turks
1672 invasion of Dutch Republic by France with English support
1670–1671 invasion of Spanish Panama by the English privateer Morgan
1668 invasion of Spanish Panama by the English privateer Morgan
1668 invasion of Spanish Cuba by the English privateer Morgan
1664 invasion of Austria by Ottoman Empire
1662 invasion of Assam by Bengal
1661–1662 invasion of Dutch Formosa by the Ming loyalists
1655 invasion of western Polish–Lithuanian Commonwealth by Sweden
1654 invasion of eastern Polish–Lithuanian Commonwealth by Russia
1653 invasion of Kingdom of Champa by Vietnam
1650 invasion of Scotland by England
1647 invasion of Ireland by England
1647 invasion of Crete by Ottoman Empire
1644 invasion of the Ming dynasty by the Qing dynasty
1636 invasion of Korea by the Qing dynasty
1630 invasion of Germany by Sweden
1627 invasion of Iceland by Barbary pirates
1627 invasion of Korea by the Later Jin
1625 invasion of western England by Barbary pirates
1625 invasion of Ottoman Istanbul by Zaporozhian Cossacks
1621 invasion of Poland by Ottoman Turks
1609 invasion of Russia by the Polish–Lithuanian Commonwealth

1500–1599 
1596 invasion of Austria by the Ottoman Empire
1594 invasion of Cambodia by Siam
1592 invasion of Burma by Siam
1592–1598 invasion of Korea by Japan
1589 invasion of Poland by the Crimean Khanate
1585 invasion of Lanzarote of the Canary Islands by Barbary pirates
1578 invasion of Kingdom of Champa by Vietnam
1563–1569 invasion of Siam by Burma
1573 invasion of Venetian Corfu by Ottoman Turks
1572 invasion of Spanish Nombre de Dios by the English privateer Drake
1571 invasion of Russia by Crimean Khanate
1571 invasion of Venetian Corfu by Ottoman Turks
1565 invasion of Malta by Ottoman Empire
1552 invasion of Kazan Khanate by Russia
1551 invasion of Tripoli by Ottoman Empire
1551 invasion of Gozo by Ottoman Empire
1548–1549 invasion of Siam by Burma
1537 invasion of Venetian Corfu by Ottoman Turks
1537 invasion of Vietnam by a Ming army
1527–1543 invasion of Ethiopia by Adal Sultanate
1529 invasion of Austria by the Ottoman Empire
1526 invasion of Hungary by the Ottoman Empire
1522 invasion of Rhodes by the Ottoman Empire
1515 invasion of Duchy Of Milan by France
1513 invasion of Duchy Of Milan by Papal-hired Swiss mercenaries and Republic of Venice
1512 invasion of Spain by Barbary pirates
1506 invasion of Poland by Crimean Tatars

1300–1499 
1499 invasion of Duchy Of Milan by France

1492 invasion of the Americas by Spain
1492 invasion of Granada by Spain
1480 invasion of Rhodes by the Ottoman Empire
1478 invasion of Kingdom of Lan Xang by Vietnam
1471 invasion of Kingdom of Champa by Vietnam
1453 invasion of Byzantium by the Ottoman Empire
1446 invasion of Kingdom of Champa by Vietnam
1431 invasion of Venetian Corfu by Ottoman Turks
1429 invasion of Malta by the Hafsids
1427 invasion of Vietnam by a Ming army
1421 invasion of Egypt by the Kingdom of Cyprus
1415 invasion of France by the Kingdom of England.
Turkoman invasions of Georgia 1407–1502
1407 invasion of Vietnam by China
1403 invasion of Venetian Corfu by the Republic of Genoa

1402 invasion of Kingdom of Champa by Vietnam
1389 invasion of Serbia by the Ottoman Empire
1389 invasion of Vietnam by the Kingdom of Champa
1385–1387 invasion of Caucasus and Northwest Iran by the Golden Horde
1382–1383 invasion of Russia by the Golden Horde
1377 invasion of Vietnam by the Kingdom of Champa
1372 invasion of Vietnam by the Kingdom of Champa
1361 invasion of Vietnam by the Kingdom of Champa
1333 invasion of Scotland by "The Disinherited" and England
1332 invasion of Scotland by "The Disinherited" from England
1312 invasion of Kingdom of Champa by Vietnam
1300 invasion of Flanders by France

Timurid invasions
1386–1403 Timur's invasions of Georgia
1400–1402 invasion of Iraq, Syria and Anatolia
1399 invasion of Ukraine
1398–1399 invasion of northern India
1394–1396 invasion of Golden Horde (second)
1389–1391 invasion of Golden Horde (first)
1380–1393 invasion of Persia
1370s invasion of Transoxiana and Khwarezm

1200–1299 
1297 invasion of Monaco by an Italian army
1296 invasion of Scotland by England
1291 invasion of Acre by the Mamluks
1268 invasion of Antioch by the Mamluks
1246 invasion of Thessaloniki by the Byzantine Empire
1224 invasion of the Kingdom of Thessaloniki by the Byzantine Despotate of Epirus
1218 invasion of Kingdom of Champa by Vietnam
1216 invasion of Kingdom of Champa by Vietnam
1204 invasion of Thessaloniki by the Fourth Crusade
1204 invasion of Constantinople by Venice and the Fourth Crusade
1203 invasion of Constantinople by Venice and the Fourth Crusade
1202 invasion of Hungary-Croatia by Venice and the Fourth Crusade

Mongol invasions

1299 invasion of Syria (third invasion)
1293 invasion of Java
1288 raid against Vietnam
1287 raid against Poland
1287 invasion of Vietnam (third attempt)
1285 raid against Bulgaria
1285 raid against Vietnam
1284–1285 invasion of Hungary
1284 invasion of Vietnam (second attempt)
1283 invasion of Kingdom of Champa
1281 invasion of Syria (second invasion)
1281 invasion of Japan
1279 invasion of Southern China
1277, 1287 invasion of Myanmar
1275 raid against Lithuania
1274 raid against Bulgaria
1274 invasion of Japan
1259 invasion of Syria (first invasion)
1259 raid against Lithuania and Poland
1258–1259 invasion of Halych-Volynia
1258 raid against Vietnam
1258 invasion of Baghdad
1257 invasion of Vietnam (first attempt)
1254 invasions of Korea (sixth campaign)
1251–1259 invasion of Persia, Syria and Mesopotamia (Timour)
1251 invasion of Korea (fifth campaign)
1247 invasion of Korea (fourth campaign)
1244 invasion of Anatolia
1242 invasion of Serbia, Bulgaria, Wallachia
1241 invasion of Poland, Lithuania, Hungary, Bohemia, Austria
1240 Mongol invasions of Tibet
1240 invasion of Ukraine
1237–1238 invasion of Russia
1235 invasion of Korea (third campaign)
1232 invasion of Korea (second campaign)
1231 invasion of Korea (first campaign)
1222, 1241, 1257, 1292, 1298, 1306, 1327 invasion of India
1220–1224 invasion of Georgians and the Cumans of the Caucasus, the Kuban, Astrakhan, Russia, Ukraine
1218–1220 invasion of Khwarizm (Iran)
1211–1234 invasion of Northern China
1205–1209 invasion of Western China

900–1199 
1195 invasion of Spain by Almohads
1191 invasion of Jaffa by England (Third Crusade)
1191 invasion of Acre by France, Conrad of Montferrat and England (Third Crusade)
1191 invasion of Cyprus by England (Third Crusade)
1189 invasion of Iconium by the Holy Roman Empire (Third Crusade)
1189 invasion of Kingdom of Jerusalem by Ayyubids (Egypt)
1177 invasion of Angkor by Rival Chams based in Central Vietnam
1171, 1173, 1177, 1183, 1187 invasion of Kingdom of Jerusalem by Ayyubids (Egypt)
1169 Invasion of Ireland by the Anglo-Normans
1167 invasion of Kingdom of Champa by Vietnam
1163, 1164, 1167, 1168 invasion of Egypt by Kingdom of Jerusalem
1161–1165 invasion of the Southern Song dynasty by the Jin dynasty 
1132 invasion of Kingdom of Champa by Vietnam
1128 invasion of Vietnam by Kingdom of Champa
1125–1142 invasion of the Northern Song dynasty by the Jin dynasty
1115–1118 invasion of Egypt by Kingdom of Jerusalem
1113 invasion of Kingdom of Jerusalem by Seljuk Turks
1110 invasion of Kalinga by Chola
1104 invasion of Kingdom of Champa by Vietnam
1102,1103,1105 invasion of Kingdom of Jerusalem by Egypt
1099 invasion of Jerusalem by the First Crusade
1097–1098 invasion of Antioch by the First Crusade
1097 invasion of Kalinga by Chola
1091 invasion of Malta by the Normans
1091 invasion of Byzantine Empire by Petchenegs
1086 Invasion of Spain by Almoravids
1085 invasion of Antioch by the Seljuk Turks
1080s invasions of the Georgian Kingdom by the Seljuk Turks
1075 invasion of China by Vietnam
1074–1075 invasion of Kingdom of Champa by Vietnam
1071 invasion of Byzantine Empire by Seljuk Turks
1069 invasion of Kingdom of Champa by Vietnam
1068 invasion of Egypt by the Seljuk Turks
1066 invasion of England by Norwegian and Norman forces
1053–54 invasion of Malta by the Byzantine Empire
1044 invasion of Kingdom of Champa by Vietnam
1043 invasion of Kingdom of Champa by Vietnam
1028–1029 invasion of Norway by Canute the Great from Anglo-Saxon England
1025 invasion of Srivijaya by Chola
1020 invasion of Kingdom of Champa by Vietnam
1019 invasion of Kyushu, Japan by Jurchen pirates
1018 invasion of Lanka (Sri Lanka) by Chola
1015–1016 invasion of Anglo-Saxon England by Danish, Norwegian, Jomsviking and Polish forces led by Canute the Great
1000 invasion of North America by Vikings
993–1019 invasion of Korea by Khitan
982 invasion of Kingdom of Champa by Vietnam
981 invasion of Vietnam by Song forces
969 invasion of Antioch by the Byzantine Empire
968 invasion of Kievan Rus by Petchenegs
955 invasion of Germany by Magyars
938 invasion of Vietnam by Southern Han forces
919–921 Second Fatimid invasion of Egypt
914–915 First Fatimid invasion of Egypt

Before 900 
870 invasion of Malta by the Aghlabids
793 invasion of BritainLindisfarne by Vikings
782 Abbasid invasion of Asia Minor by Arabs
772 invasion of Saxony by Charlemagne
763 invasion of Tang China by Tibetans
732 invasion of France by Arabs
718 invasion of Byzantine Empire by Arabs
711–718 invasion of Visigothic Hispania by a Moorish army of the second caliphate
657 invasion of the Western Turkic Khaganate by China
651 invasion of Champa and Vietnam by the third caliphate
648 invasion of Karasahr by the Tang dynasty
645–668 invasion of Korea by the Tang dynasty
644 invasion of Karasahr by the Tang dynasty
642–711 invasion of Algeria by the Umayyads
640 invasion of Karakhoja by the Tang dynasty
639–640 invasion of the Eastern Turkic Khaganate by China
639–641 invasion of Egypt by the second caliphate
636 invasion of Antioch by the second caliphate
633–651 invasion of Sasanian Empire by the first caliphate
602 invasion of Vietnam by a Sui army
600 invasion of Antioch by the Byzantine Empire
586 invasion of Byzantine Empire by Persia
598–614 invasion of Korea by China
544 invasion of Vietnam by Chen Baxian
543 invasion of Vietnam by Kingdom of Champa
 543 Roman invasion of Persarmenia by the Byzantine Empire
540 invasion of Antioch by the Sasanid Empire
520 or 525 invasion of Yemen by Ethiopia (Kingdom of Aksum)
440 Huns invade the Eastern Roman Empire
429 invasion of the Iberian peninsula by the Visigoths
409 invasion of the Iberian peninsula by Vandals and Alans
409 invasion of the NW of the Iberian peninsula by Suebians
406 invasion of Gallia by Vandals, Alans and Suebians
363 invasion of Persia by the Roman Empire
349 invasion of Meroe by Ethiopia (Kingdom of Aksum)
249 invasion of Roman Empire by Persia
43 AD invasion of Vietnam by a Han army
43 AD invasion of Britain by the Roman Empire
56 and 55 BC invasions of Britain by the Roman Republic
58 and 57 BC invasions of France (Gaul) by the Roman Republic
65 BC invasion of Georgia (Colchis and Iberia) by the Roman Republic
111 BC invasion of Vietnam by a Han army
121 BC invasion of France (Celtic Gaul) by the Roman Republic
149 BC invasion of Carthago by the Roman Republic
208 BC invasion of Vietnam by China
218 BC invasion of Vietnam by a Qin army
219 BC invasion of Lusitania by the Roman Republic
221 BC invasion of Vietnam by Qin Shi Huang
258 BC invasion of Vietnam by Âu Việt tribe led by Thục Phán
279 BC invasion of Balkans  by Gauls
Approximately between 18th–13th century BC invasion of Canaan by Joshua and the Israelites
Approximately between 22nd–21st century BC invasion of Vietnam by Ân tribes.

Muslim conquests

Punic Wars

Macedonian invasions

Peloponnesian War

431–404 BC multiple invasions of Athens and allies by Sparta and allies; multiple invasions of Spartan allies by Athens and allies

Persian invasions of Greece

 480–479 BCE Second Persian invasion of Greece
 492–490 BCE First Persian invasion of Greece

See also
 List of coups d'état and coup attempts
 List of revolutions and rebellions

References 

Lists of military conflicts
Timelines of military conflicts